Eucerceris is a genus of wasps in the family Crabronidae. There are more than 40 described species in Eucerceris.

Species
The genus Eucerceris contains 41 extant species:

 Eucerceris angulata Rohwer, 1912
 Eucerceris arenaria Scullen, 1948
 Eucerceris atrata Scullen, 1968
 Eucerceris baccharidis Scullen, 1968
 Eucerceris barri Scullen, 1968
 Eucerceris bitruncata Scullen, 1939
 Eucerceris brunnea Scullen, 1948
 Eucerceris canaliculata (Say, 1823)
 Eucerceris cavagnaroi Scullen, 1968
 Eucerceris cerceriformis Cameron, 1891
 Eucerceris conata Scullen, 1939
 Eucerceris cressoni (Schletterer, 1887)
 Eucerceris ferruginosa Scullen, 1939
 Eucerceris flavocincta Cresson, 1865
 Eucerceris geboharti G. Ferguson, 1982
 Eucerceris lacunosa Scullen, 1939
 Eucerceris lapazensis Scullen, 1968
 Eucerceris melanosa Scullen, 1948
 Eucerceris melanovittata Scullen, 1948
 Eucerceris mellea Scullen, 1948
 Eucerceris melleoides G. Ferguson, 1982
 Eucerceris montana Cresson, 1882
 Eucerceris morula Scullen, 1968
 Eucerceris nevadensis (Dalla Torre, 1890)
 Eucerceris pacifica Scullen, 1948
 Eucerceris pimarum Cockerell & Rohwer, 1908
 Eucerceris provancheri (Dalla Torre, 1890)
 Eucerceris punctifrons (Cameron, 1890)
 Eucerceris rubripes Cresson, 1879
 Eucerceris ruficeps Scullen, 1948
 Eucerceris sculleni G. Ferguson, 1982
 Eucerceris similis Cresson, 1879
 Eucerceris sinuata Scullen, 1939
 Eucerceris sonorae Scullen, 1968
 Eucerceris stangei Scullen, 1968
 Eucerceris superba Cresson, 1865
 Eucerceris tricolor Cockerell, 1897
 Eucerceris velutina Scullen, 1948
 Eucerceris violaceipennis Scullen, 1939
 Eucerceris vittatifrons Cresson, 1879
 Eucerceris zonata (Say, 1823)

References

Crabronidae
Articles created by Qbugbot